Martin County, Florida (located in South-East Florida), operates a system of county roads that serve all portions of the county. The Martin County Roadway Design & Construction Division is responsible for maintaining all of the Martin County roads.

The numbers and routes of all Florida highways are assigned by the Florida Department of Transportation (FDOT), while county road numbers are assigned by the counties, with guidance from FDOT. North-south routes are generally assigned odd numbers, while east-west routes are generally assigned even numbers.

List of County Roads in Martin County, Florida

References

 State of Florida, Dept. of Transportation, Survey and Mapping Office: General Highway Map of Martin County, Florida
 Martin County Roadway Design & Construction Division: Township, Range, and Section Boundaries with Road Network
FDOT GIS data, accessed January 2014

 
County